Chamzinka (Čaunza) is an urban locality (a work settlement) and the administrative center of Chamzinsky District of the Republic of Mordovia, Russia. As of the 2010 Census, its population was 9,463.

History
It was founded in 1624; urban-type settlement status was granted to it in 1960.

Administrative and municipal status
Within the framework of administrative divisions, Chamzinka serves as the administrative center of Chamzinsky District. As an administrative division, the work settlement of Chamzinka, together with two rural localities, is incorporated within Chamzinsky District as Chamzinka Work Settlement. As a municipal division, Chamzinka Work Settlement is incorporated within Chamzinsky Municipal District as Chamzinka Urban Settlement.

References

Notes

Sources

Urban-type settlements in Mordovia
Chamzinsky District
Ardatovsky Uyezd (Simbirsk Governorate)